Funky Squad was a short-lived 1995 Australian comedy television series which satirised 1970s-era U.S. police television dramas, such as The Mod Squad. Only seven half-hour episodes were produced, which were broadcast on the ABC. Real television commercials from the 1970s were shown during the program's "commercial breaks".

The show featured four "funky" undercover detectives: undetectable as police, given their "hipness". The conclusion of each episode was deliberately designed to be incredibly predictable: usually the perpetrator of the crime under investigation could be identified within the first few minutes of the episode.

Before the television series, Funky Squad originally aired as a series of episodes on radio station Triple M. Rob Sitch, who played Grant, was replaced by Tim Ferguson when the series went to television.

Characters
In a metafictional setting, the characters were played by "actors" whose "names" were displayed in the opening credits of the program. These "real names" were also satirical, poking fun at the names of actors who appeared in American 1970s cop shows.

"Stix": Joey Alvarez
 Played by Santo Cilauro
 Had a large afro.

"Grant": Blair Steele
 Played by Tim Ferguson
 The leader of the group; the cool guy.

"Poncho": Harvey Zdalka Jr
 Played by Tom Gleisner
 Mute, as a bullet had hit his tongue. The joke was that this was a ridiculous plot device to get around having accidentally hired an actor with poor English.

"Cassie": Verity Svensön-Hart
 Played by Jane Kennedy 
 The token female; a stereotypical 1970s feminist.

The Chief: Baldwin Scott
 Played by Barry Friedlander
 The tough cop to whom the Funky Squad reported.

Production
The program was created and written by Australian comedians Santo Cilauro, Jane Kennedy, Tom Gleisner, and Rob Sitch of Frontline and The Late Show fame. Cilauro, Kennedy and Gleisner also co-directed the series. Sitch was originally to star but was replaced by Ferguson due to study commitments overseas.

The show was given a meagre production budget of A$1,000 per episode, so many of the costumes were acquired by wardrobe director Kitty Stuckey (best known for her work on Kath & Kim) at local Melburnian Salvation Army stores.

Merchandise including video and DVD release
In 1995 The Funky Squad Annual was published. Unlike many TV show tie-ins this was not a behind-the-scenes work or analysis of the show but was a parody of annuals for TV shows in the 1970s. As such it addressed a child readership and included many pictures, features, puzzles and comic strips.

A VHS video containing three episodes of the series ("A Degree in Death", "Wrong Side of the Tracks" and "The Carnival is Over") was released in 1996. A DVD set of all seven episodes of the series was released in Australia on 7 November 2007. The DVDs were marked as Region 4, but appear to be region-free.

References

External links

Unofficial Episode Guide

1995 Australian television series debuts
1995 Australian television series endings
1990s police comedy television series
Australian Broadcasting Corporation original programming
Australian comedy television series
Television shows set in Melbourne